The Mākākahi River runs through the Manawatū-Whanganui region of the North Island of New Zealand.

From its headwaters south of Eketāhuna
it flows northwest alongside State Highway 2 for  before feeding into the Mangatainoka River near Pahiatua.

References 

Rivers of Manawatū-Whanganui
Rivers of New Zealand